Hardy Middle School can refer to United States middle schools:
 Rose Hardy Middle School in Washington, DC
 Hardy Middle School in Jackson, Mississippi